Jean Origer (25 May 1877 - 17 September 1942) was a Luxembourgish cleric and director of the newspaper Luxemburger Wort. Jean Origer was born in Esch-Alzette and later became a member of the Chamber of Deputies of Luxembourg. During World War II, He was interned in the Mauthausen concentration camp where he died. A street in his hometown of Esch-Alzette is named after him.

See also 
 KZ Mauthausen
 Luxemburger Wort

Further reading
 Alzin, Josse  (Joseph-Adolphe Alzinger 1899–1978) 1947. Martyrologe 40-45. Le calvaire et la mort de 80 prêtres belges et luxembourgeois. Editions Fasbender, Arlon, pp. 23–27.
 Molitor, Edouard (1963). Mgr Jean Origer. Defensor civitatis. Luxemburg

External links 
 in French and English : Site of luxembourgian and belgian clergymen who died in World War 2

1877 births
1942 deaths
People from Esch-sur-Alzette
Luxembourgian clergy
Members of the Chamber of Deputies (Luxembourg) from Sud
People who died in Mauthausen concentration camp
Newspaper editors
Luxembourgian people who died in Nazi concentration camps